Edith Sophia Hooper (4 March 1868 – 21 April 1926) was a British suffragette, born in Tenby, Pembrokeshire, Wales. She was matriculated at University of St Andrews, and wrote the biographies of Josephine Butler, Frank Podmore, George Rundle Prynne, Joseph Skipsey and William Westall.

References

1868 births
1926 deaths
British suffragists
20th-century British women writers
People from Tenby
Alumni of the University of St Andrews